Libyana Mobile Phone is a Libyan mobile phone company established in 2004. It is one of the two major mobile phone operators owned by the Libyan Post Telecommunications & Information Technology Company (LPTIC).

Due to the damages in the Libyan electricity and telecommunication infrastructures post the Libyan revolution in 2011, and due to the consequent power shortages, Libyana's mobile network coverage has been adversely affected, leaving some areas in Libya with low mobile network coverage.

Libyana Network Technology
 GSM-900, GSM-1800
 2G (GPRS, GPRS E)
 3G (HSPA, HSPA+)
 4G (LTE)

Libyana Social Responsibility Projects

Libyana is committed to serving the Libyan community.

References

Telecommunications companies of Libya
Economy of Tripoli, Libya